Decani is the side of a church choir occupied by the Dean. In English churches, this is typically the choir stalls on the south side of the chancel. The opposite side is known as Cantoris.

The association of the Dean with the south side has propagated from the Sarum (now Salisbury Cathedral) liturgical norm, a practice that then propagated through pre-Reformation England and Wales. There are some notable exceptions in the monastic cathedrals, where the senior cleric under the bishop was the prior; he often sat on the liturgical north. Hence, in Durham Cathedral, Ely Cathedral, St Davids Cathedral, Carlisle Cathedral, and Southwell Minster, decani is on the north.

See also
 Epistle side

References 

Choirs
Church architecture